The JXD P861 is a 7-inch Android tablet PC produced by JXD released in 2013.

Features
In addition to its 7-inch, five-point capacitive touch screen, the P861 features a 0.3 megapixel front camera, and a 0.3 megapixel rear camera. It is equipped with a MTKB312, dual core, 1.3 GHz chipset. The system runs Android 4.2 as an operating system. The memory of this unit is 512 MB RAM plus 4 GB ROM and it supports WIFI. The battery capacity is up to 2500mAh.

Revisions
About a month later after the release of JXD P861, JXD released JXD P1000M which was equipped with a 7-inch 5-point 800*480 touchscreen, MTK6572, Dual Core, 1.2 GHz chipset, the battery capacity was up to 3650 mAh. 

Later, the JXD P1000S was released in the Chinese 
market, it was equipped with an internal 2100mAh plus a removable 1960 mAh battery.

See also
 JXD
 HTC Flyer

References

External links
 JXD official website
 JXD Product Information

Android (operating system) software
Smartphones
Tablet computers